Sayed Kayan or Sayed of Kayan is a position of leadership amongst the Ismaili community in Afghanistan. The Ismaili community in Afghanistan is led by a family of Sayeds (descendants of the Islamic prophet Mohammed) hailing from the village of Kayan.

Family History and Leadership
The family of Sayed Kayan has served as the representative of the Ismailia Iamam in Afghanistan for over last two centuries.

Among the notable figures to hold the title of Sayed Kayan:
Sayed Nader Shah: Sayed Nader Shah Kayani was a well-known tribal elder, scholar and philosopher in Afghanistan. According to some reports, he has written over 50 religious books, some of them has officially been published and distributed including Payam-e-Shamal and Andarz Haye Payambar.
After his death, the title was passed on to his eldest son, Sayed Shah Naser Naderi.
Sayed Shah Naser Naderi: He was first appointed to lead the Afghanistan Ismailis after the death of his father Sayed Kayan. After few months or years, he left Afghanistan and appointed his younger brother Sayed Mansoor Naderi to lead the Ismailis in Afghanistan.
 Sayed Mansoor Naderi: He played a significant role in leading Afghan Ismaili after his father Sayed Nader Shah Kayani, known as Sayed Kayan. He had over 12,000 armed forces in 1990s that was controlling several Northeastern provinces including Baghlan, Samangan, Kunduz and Parts of Balkh province of Afghanistan.
 Sadat Mansoor Naderi: He is the son of Sayed Mansoor Naderi who has been educated in the west. He has lived and studied in the United Kingdom. In 2015, he was appointed as the Minister of Urban Development and Housing of Afghanistan by Ashraf Ghani and in 2020 he was selected as the State Minister of Peace by both leaders in Afghanistan, Abdullah Abdullah and Ashraf Ghani.
 Farkhunda Zahra Naderi: She is the daughter of Sayed Mansoor Naderi who played a key role during the democracy era in Afghanistan. She was elected as member of parliament from Kabul in 2010 and then served as a senior advisor to Ashraf Ghani in 2015. She received the N-Peace award in 2012 which was organized by the United Nations.
 Sayed Jafar Naderi: He is the eldest son of Sayed Mansoor Naderi who is also known as the Warlord of Kayan. He was the leading Ismaili commander in 1990s.
Sayed Humayoon Naderi Sayed Naser's eldest son.
Sayed Haroon Naderi the eldest grandson of Sayed Naser.

The Ismailis mostly live in different provinces of Afghanistan including Kabul, Parwan, Maidan Wardak, Bamyan, Baghlan, and Samangan, Balkh, Kunduz, Takhar, and Badakhshan.

References

External links
The Ismailis of Afghanistan: THE SAYEDS OF KAYAN

Baghlan Province
Ismailism in Afghanistan